The United Soccer Conference was an NCAA Division I conference founded in 2005 whose members competed in the sport of women's soccer. On February 10, 2007, New Jersey Institute of Technology joined the conference, however later that year on July 1, 2007, Indiana Purdue-Fort Wayne, North Dakota State, and South Dakota State left the conference and joined The Summit League.  On February 12, 2009, it was announced that the Great West Conference would add Delaware State, Howard, and South Carolina State as associate members to compete in a soccer conference with Houston Baptist, NJIT, North Dakota, South Dakota, and Utah Valley beginning with the 2009–2010 school year.   This left Longwood to compete as an independent for the 2009–10 school year, and caused the United Soccer Conference to fold.

Charter members of the conference were Delaware State, Howard, IPFW, Longwood, South Carolina State, and Utah Valley

Former members

Conference Champions

References
Replica Soccer Jerseys

External links
 Official website

Defunct NCAA Division I conferences
2005 establishments in the United States
Women's soccer leagues in the United States
Sports leagues established in 2005
2009 disestablishments in the United States
Sports leagues disestablished in 2009